In spectroscopy, an isosbestic point is a specific wavelength, wavenumber or frequency at which the total absorbance of a sample does not change during a chemical reaction or a physical change of the sample. The word derives from two Greek words: "iso", meaning "equal", and "sbestos", meaning "extinguishable".

Isosbestic plot 
When an isosbestic plot is constructed by the superposition of the absorption spectra of two species (whether by using molar absorptivity for the representation, or by using absorbance and keeping the same molar concentration for both species), the isosbestic point corresponds to a wavelength at which these spectra cross each other.

A pair of substances can have several isosbestic points in their spectra.

When a 1-to-1 (one mole of reactant gives one mole of product) chemical reaction (including equilibria) involves a pair of substances with an isosbestic point, the absorbance of the reaction mixture at this wavelength remains invariant, regardless of the extent of reaction (or the position of the chemical equilibrium). This occurs because the two substances absorb light of that specific wavelength to the same extent, and the analytical concentration remains constant.

For the reaction:

the analytical concentration is the same at any point in the reaction:

.

The absorbance of the reaction mixture (assuming it depends only on X and Y) is:

.

But at the isosbestic point, both molar absorptivities are the same:

.

Hence, the absorbance 

does not depend on the extent of reaction (i.e., on the particular concentrations of X and Y)

The requirement for an isosbestic point to occur is that the two species involved are related linearly by stoichiometry, such that the absorbance is invariant at a certain wavelength. Thus, ratios other than 1-to-1 are possible. The presence of an isosbestic point typically indicates that only two species that vary in concentration contribute to the absorption around the isosbestic point. If a third one is partaking in the process, the spectra typically intersect at varying wavelengths as concentrations change, creating the impression that the isosbestic point is 'out of focus', or that it will shift as conditions change. The reason for this is that it would be very unlikely for three compounds to have extinction coefficients linked in a linear relationship by chance for one particular wavelength.

Applications

In chemical kinetics, isosbestic points are used as reference points in the study of reaction rates, as the absorbance at those wavelengths remains constant throughout the whole reaction.

Isosbestic points are used in medicine in a laboratory technique called oximetry to determine hemoglobin concentration, regardless of its saturation. Oxyhaemoglobin and deoxyhaemoglobin have (not exclusively) isosbestic points at 586 nm and  near 808 nm.

Isosbestic points are also used in clinical chemistry, as a quality assurance method, to verify the accuracy in the wavelength of a spectrophotometer. This is done by measuring the spectra of a standard substance at two different pH conditions (above and below the pKa of the substance). The standards used include potassium dichromate (isosbestic points at 339 and 445 nm), bromothymol blue (325 and 498 nm) and congo red (541 nm). The wavelength of the isosbestic point determined does not depend on the concentration of the substance used, and so it becomes a very reliable reference.

Isosbestic points are also used in organic synthesis, as in the example shown here, the key step in the A/D variant of the total syntheses of vitamin B12 by A. Eschenmoser et al. (ETH Zurich): A/D-corrin-ring closure by the photochemical A/D-seco-corrin corrin → cycloisomerization). The isosbestic points provide proof for a direct conversion of the seco-corrin complex to the metal-free corrin ligand without intermediary or side products (within the detection limits of UV/VIS spectroscopy).

References 

Spectroscopy